Thomas Joseph Lennon (February 25, 1866 – August 14, 1926) was an associate justice of the Supreme Court of California from December 20, 1918, to August 14, 1926.

Biography
Lennon was born at Marysville, California, on February 25, 1866, and educated in the public schools. During high school, he studied at the Sacramento Institute, where at commencement in June 1881 he presented a speech on "right of free discussion." He then enrolled at St. Mary's College in San Francisco and in 1885 graduated with a B.S. degree. He joined the National Guard and in 1887 was promoted from corporal to second lieutenant, before becoming a captain by 1890.

He read law and on January 12, 1888, was admitted to the California bar. He was active in Republican Party politics and civic groups. In 1891, he was president of the Young Man's Institute, a charity. In 1898, he sought the position of Police Judge in San Francisco. He moved to San Rafael, California, in Mill Valley, and in 1902 was elected judge of the Marin County Superior Court on the Republican ticket, filling the vacancy left by Frank M. Angellotti's elevation to the California Supreme Court. In 1910, Lennon won election as Presiding Justice of the District Court of Appeal for the First District.

In February 1918, Lennon announced his candidacy for the California Supreme Court. During the campaign, he presented a proposal to streamline court cases, and was endorsed by Republican Senator Hiram Johnson. In 1919, he was elected over incumbent William G. Lorigan as an associate justice of the Supreme Court, along with Curtis D. Wilbur who won re-election. In December 1918, Governor William Stephens appointed William H. Waste to Lennon's vacant seat as Presiding Justice of the Court of Appeals, First District. Lennon remained in office until his death on August 14, 1926. Prior to his death, he had announced his candidacy for Chief Justice in the November 1926 election against William H. Waste, and Lennon's name appeared on the ballot but in effect Waste ran unopposed. After Lennon's death, in October 1926 Governor Friend Richardson named Frank G. Finlayson to fill Lennon's unexpired term, though Finlayson lost in the November election a month later to John W. Preston.

Personal life
In 1893, he married Emily L. Lenhart. They had a son, Thomas Lloyd Lennon, who became an attorney.

See also
 List of justices of the Supreme Court of California

References

External links
 Thomas J. Lennon. California Supreme Court Historical Society.
 In Memoriam
 Thomas J. Lennon. Robert Crown Library, Stanford Law School.
 Thomas J. Lennon Supreme Court opinions and Court of Appeal opinions. Courtlistener.com.
 
 

1866 births
1926 deaths
Saint Mary's College of California alumni
People from Marysville, California
U.S. state supreme court judges admitted to the practice of law by reading law
Superior court judges in the United States
Judges of the California Courts of Appeal
Justices of the Supreme Court of California
Lawyers from San Francisco
20th-century American judges
19th-century American lawyers
California Republicans